Mount Dutton is a stratovolcano in the Aleutian Range of the U.S. state of Alaska, on the Alaska Peninsula.

Geography 

Geologic activity 

Dutton is a highly glaciated volcano. Its summit is composed of a series of lava domes which form a complex stratovolcano. The mountain's recent history is marked by at least avalanche which removed andesitic lava flows and several lava domes from the flank of its body and swiftly cascaded westward and southward towards Belkofski Bay.

Between 1984 and 1985, a series of earthquake swarms took place in the volcano's vicinity. Another swarm took place in the summer of 1988.

See also
List of volcanoes in the United States

References

Sources
 Volcanoes of the Alaska Peninsula and Aleutian Islands-Selected Photographs
 Alaska Volcano Observatory

Volcanoes of Aleutians East Borough, Alaska
Stratovolcanoes of the United States
Mountains of Alaska
Volcanoes of Alaska
Aleutian Range
Mountains of Aleutians East Borough, Alaska
Holocene stratovolcanoes